The Ostweg is a north-south long-distance path through the Black Forest from Pforzheim to Schaffhausen. The roughly 240-kilometre-long ridgeway was laid out in 1903 and has been managed and maintained since then by the Black Forest Club. Its waymark is a black and red diamond on a white background.

Day tours/stages

First stage: Pforzheim – Bad Liebenzell

Overview 
 Distance: 25 km
 Journey time: c. 6 hours

Route description 
The starting point is the Kupferhammer south of Pforzheim. The path runs initially parallel to the road into the Würm valley and then climbs up to the right through the Pforzheim district of Würm and back down to the valley again. At a forest car park the path crosses a wooden bridge and continues to the ruins of Liebeneck. Carrying on up the Würm valley it reaches Hamberg, leaving it on the Schlossstraße. After a chapel it runs past the ruins of Steinegg to Neuhausen. Next the walk crosses the little bridge of Monbachbrückle into the Monbach valley. The Monbach empties into the River Nagold. At their confluence the path turns right and runs parallel to the railway line to Bad Liebenzell.

Second stage: Bad Liebenzell – Oberhaugstett

Overview 
 Distance: 21 km
 Journey time: c. 5 hours

Route description 

After leaving the outskirts of Bad Liebenzell the path leads to the Wolfsschlucht gorge near Ernstmühl and then to the village of Hirsau with its ruined abbey dating to the 11th century. Calw itself is then reached via the Hirsauer Wiesenweg. Along Inselgasse and Lederstraße the path continues via the market place (Marktplatz) and Salzgasse out of the town to the rock massif of Gimbelstein and on to the Zavelstein Hostel which lies next to the Zavelsteiner Krokuswiesen Nature Reserve, In Zavelstein the route continues along Staufer Straße and Krokusstraße to the castle. Then the walk descends steeply to Bad Teinach. At the church the path turns right into Badstraße, goes past the Kurhaus and through the spa grounds uphill to Liebelsberg. Just before the village there is a water tower, which is also used as a viewing tower. From Liebelsberg a tarmac path leads to Oberhaugstett, which is reached along the road called Am Schleifberg.

Third stage: Oberhaugstett – Pfalzgrafenweiler

Overview 
 Distance: 22 km
 Journey time: c. 5.5 hours

Route description 
We leave Oberhaugstett on Martinsmooser Straße; the path goes past the watchtower (Wart) to the castle and village of Berneck. Other destinations are Altensteigdorf, Altensteig, the Kohlsägmühle mill, the Zinsbachmühle mill and the end of the stage at Pfalzgrafenweiler.

Fourth stage: Pfalzgrafenweiler – Freudenstadt

Overview 
 Distance: 18.5 km
 Journey time: c. 4.5 hours

Route description 
We leave Pfalzgrafenweiler on Christoph-Decker-Straße. After 9 kilometres the path reaches Obermusbach. There the walk continues along Kälberbronner Straße, Klosterstraße and Mühlhaldenstraße to Untermusbach. Here it continues along Mühlhaldenstraße, past the sports field, along Merzenbergstraße and Müllerstraße out of the village. Passing Frutenhof and Wittlensweiler it leads to Freudenstadt. In the town the route passes the cemetery and reaches the railway station. It then goes along Musbacher Straße and Stuttgarter Straße to the market place (Marktplatz).

Fifth stage: Freudenstadt – Alpirsbach

Overview 
 Distance: 21.5 km
 Journey time: c. 5 hours

Route description 
After the market place the route continues through Freudenstadt along Loßburger Straße, Straßburger Straße, Lauterbadstraße, Friedrich-Ebert-Straße and Herzog-Friedrich-Straße to the Friedrichsturm tower on the Kienberg. The route then runs past the Vogtei Tower to the Adrionshof and on to Ödenwald. About 2 kilometres further on it reaches a large forest clearing. It continues along the edge of the wood and the road to Schömberg, leaving via Reinerzauerstraße and Altenburgstraße. After 2 kilometres the route leaves the track in the forest district of Hardt and follows a narrow footpath. After the Heilenberger Hut it continues, in places very steeply, down to Alpirsbach, which is reached via Forchenweg.

Sixth stage: Alpirsbach – Schramberg

Overview 
 Distance: 19 km
 Journey time: c. 5.5 hours

Seventh stage: Schramberg – Villingen

Overview 
 Distance: 27.5 km
 Journey time: c. 7 hours

Eighth stage: Villingen – Sunthausen

Overview 
 Distance: 16.5 km
 Journey time: c. 4 hours

Ninth stage: Sunthausen – Geisingen

Overview 
 Distance: 16 km
 Journey time: c. 4 hours

Tenth stage: Geisingen – Achdorf

Overview 
 Distance: 23 km
 Journey time: c. 6 hours

Eleventh stage: Achdorf – Stühlingen

Overview 
 Distance: 16.5 km
 Journey time: c. 4.5 hours

Twelfth stage: Stühlingen – Schaffhausen

Overview 
 Distance: 19 km
 Journey time: c. 5 hours

Route description 

The route leaves Stühlingen via Hauptstraße and Bahnhofstraße.

Literature 
Reinhard Distel und Heinz R. Wittner: Wanderführer Schwarzwald-Höhenwege. 7th edn., Ostfildern, 1997. . pp. 111–141

External links 
 Wanderservice Black Forest: web service by the Black Forest Club for visualising the Black Forest trails on Google Maps with various overlays (trail network, waysigns, accommodation, …)
 GPS Wanderatlas Deutschland: complete tour description with current GPS data and digital hiking map

Hiking trails in Baden-Württemberg
Transport in the Black Forest